Don't Worry, I'm Fine is a 2006 French drama film directed by Philippe Lioret based on the 2000 novel of the same name by Olivier Adam.

Plot
Lili, a 19-year-old, discovers her twin brother Loc has left the house after a violent argument with their father when she gets home from vacation. Lili and her brother had a close bond, so when she suddenly lost contact with him, she was devastated. She assumed that something had happened to her brother.

Lili stops eating and begins losing strength and ends up in the hospital where she has decided to stop living at all. She receives a letter from Loïc where he apologizes for leaving without a word or getting back to her and makes it very clear that he will not be coming back. He also says that he has been traveling around living on petty jobs and blames their father for his lot in life. Lili recovers and begins looking for her twin by following the trail of the letters she has received along with Thomas, the boyfriend of her friend from school, Lea. Lili and Thomas gradually fall in love.
 
When Lili goes to Saint Aubin with Thomas, she sees her father mailing letters, concluding that her father was imitating Loïc's handwriting and sending letters to Lili, in an attempt to protect her and keep her alive. Coincidentally, Thomas, when visiting his grandmother's grave, sees Loïc's gravestone. When Thomas arrives at Lili's house for a family lunch, he speaks with her parents, mentioning that he knows of Loïc's death. They reveal that Loïc had died in an accident during mountain climbing, and they plead for Thomas not to tell Lili anything. Thomas believes that they are crazy. Lili, who arrives home shortly after to meet Thomas and her parents for the lunch, finds her brother's guitar hidden in her father's car. Knowing he would never have left behind his beloved guitar, she learns that he can not just have gone away.

Even though both Lili and Thomas know the truth by now, they don't talk about it, even though Loïc has been the most important thing on their minds for the past year. They talk about leaving the city and going to the sea.

Cast
 Mélanie Laurent as Lili 
 Kad Merad as Paul
 Julien Boisselier as Thomas
 Isabelle Renauld as Isabelle
 Aïssa Maïga as Léa
 Martine Chevallier as The first nurse
 Thibault de Montalembert as The psychiatrist
 Pierre-Benoist Varoclier as The driver

Reception
The film had positive reviews.

Awards and nominations
César Awards
Won: Best Actor – Supporting Role (Kad Merad)
Won: Most Promising Actress (Mélanie Laurent)
Nominated: Best Director (Philippe Lioret)
Nominated: Best Film
Nominated: Best Writing – Adaptation (Olivier Adam and Philippe Lioret)
Lumières Awards
Won: Most Promising Actor (Julien Boisselier)
Won: Most Promising Actress (Mélanie Laurent)
Prix Romy Schneider for Mélanie Laurent

References

External links 

2006 drama films
2006 films
Films directed by Philippe Lioret
Films featuring a Best Supporting Actor César Award-winning performance
French drama films
2000s French-language films
Twins in fiction
Films scored by Nicola Piovani
2000s French films